Milap Pradeepkumar Mewada (born 15 September 1974) is a former Indian first-class cricketer who played for Baroda from 1996/97 to 2004/05. He became a cricket coach after his playing career.

Life and career
Born in Mehsana, Gujarat, Mewada played for India under-19s in the 1993/94 season before getting selected in the Baroda senior team two seasons later. As a wicket-keeper, he appeared in a total of 11 first-class and 26 List A matches in a career that spanned between 1996/97 and 2004/05. He also represented West Zone in the Deodhar Trophy.

Mewada took up cricket coaching following his retirement. After having worked as the assistant coach of Baroda, Mewada coached the Chhattisgarh under-19 team which qualified for the knockout stage of a domestic competition. He was selected as the head coach of Jammu and Kashmir in 2018, with former Baroda teammate Irfan Pathan being named its mentor.

References

External links 
 
 

1974 births
Living people
Indian cricketers
Baroda cricketers
West Zone cricketers
Indian cricket coaches
People from Mehsana district